The 2022 CONCACAF W Championship knockout stage was a single-elimination tournament which made up the latter part of the 2022 CONCACAF W Championship, held from 14–18 July 2022 in Mexico. The teams competing in this stage were Canada, Costa Rica, Jamaica, and the United States. All four countries had already qualified for the 2023 FIFA Women's World Cup. The winner qualified for the 2024 Summer Olympics and the 2024 CONCACAF W Gold Cup, while the runner-up and third place will play in a single-leg play-off for both tournaments.

Qualified teams

The winners and runners-up of Group A and Group B qualified for the knockout stage.

Bracket

Semi-finals

United States vs Costa Rica

Canada vs Jamaica

Third place match

Final

References